300 North Meridian is a high rise in Indianapolis, Indiana. Construction started in 1987, financed by Browning Investments. The architects, Haldeman Miller Bregman Hamann (now BOKA Powell), built the outside with brownish-reddish granite and black windows, and capped the skyscraper with a copper-colored dome. Only the eastern side rises to the full height of the building; the northern and southern sides rise in a staircase shape toward the east. The architects intended 300 North Meridian's design to echo the adjacent Chamber of Commerce building. It was completed in 1989 and is currently the fifth-tallest building in the city.

300 North Meridian is primarily used for office space, although 9 of its floors are occupied by a parking garage. Of the building's 509,582 square feet of space, only 347,551 square feet are usable by offices. As of February 2014, 17.5% of the usable office space is vacant, and the building is owned by REI Real Estate Services. The building was valued at $39 million in 2013.

One of the main tenants of 300 North Meridian is the law firm Faegre Drinker Biddle & Reath, known as Baker & Daniels at the time of construction. The group has a lobby on the 25th floor.

Recognition
After its construction, 300 North Meridian received several awards from architecture and engineering associations. Some are listed below.
 1989: Building Owners and Managers Association International's Urban Office Building of the Year Award 
 1990: American Concrete Institute, Outstanding Achievement in Concrete

See also
List of tallest buildings in Indianapolis
List of tallest buildings in Indiana

References

External links
300 North Meridian at Skyscraper Page
300 North Meridian at Emporis

Skyscraper office buildings in Indianapolis
Office buildings completed in 1989
1989 establishments in Indiana